The Cathedral Church of St. John is an Episcopal cathedral located in Albuquerque, New Mexico, United States. It is the seat of the Diocese of the Rio Grande. In 2018 the cathedral church was listed on the National Register of Historic Places.

History 
St. John's was established in 1882. Land was purchased at the southeast corner of Fourth Street and Silver Avenue for $5,000 and the first church building was built that same year. It was a Gothic Revival building built from red Arizona sandstone and brick with a corner bell tower. The first service, led by Bishop George Kelly Dunlop, was held in November 1882 with 33 people in attendance. The Vestry of St. John's passed a resolution and the Convocation of 1920 approved the designation of St. John's as the cathedral church of the Missionary District of New Mexico and Southwest Texas for a one-year trial.  Three years later new canons were adopted and the designation became official.

Henry R.A. O’Malley became dean and raised $25,000 for the Cathedral House, which was to house offices for the parish and the Missionary District. It was designed by Santa Fe architect John Gaw Meem and its cornerstone was placed on Easter Sunday, 1930. Meem was retained in 1950 to design the new cathedral to replace the old church. Meem's design preserved the front and side entrances and bell tower from the old church while adding a much larger nave, executed in a modern Gothic style using brick and reclaimed stone. The groundbreaking was held the day after Easter in 1951 and the first services in the new cathedral were held on October 5, 1952. It was dedicated on November 11, 1952.

Anne Tropeano, who was from New Mexico, was ordained by the woman priest movement here, in October of 2021. She is known as "Father Anne" and is not supported by the Roman Catholic church.

See also
List of the Episcopal cathedrals of the United States
List of cathedrals in the United States

References

External links

Cathedral website

Religious organizations established in 1882
Churches completed in 1952
Gothic Revival church buildings in New Mexico
Episcopal church buildings in New Mexico
John, Albuquerque
Churches in Albuquerque, New Mexico
National Register of Historic Places in Albuquerque, New Mexico
Churches on the National Register of Historic Places in New Mexico